"Bloed, zweet en tranen" is a song by André Hazes. It is the fifth track of his 2002 album Strijdlustig, it was released as the b-side to his single "Ik hou van jou" that same year. The song reached the Top 100 in the Netherlands, peaking at number 17. It is one of André Hazes's most popular songs. It was to be the last single that André Hazes would release under his own name, with the following single being his duet with Johnny Logan.

Having seen a little commercial success in 2002, the song has become an evergreen of sorts to supporters of the Netherlands national football team, and received heavy rotation during the FIFA 2010 World Cup amongst the supporters. Which is the reason the song began to chart again on Radio 2-Top 2000 in 2010. The song has also been played at the Amsterdam ArenA at home matches of AFC Ajax, the football club of André Hazes hometown Amsterdam, since its release in 2002. One of the highlights was when his son Dré Hazes Jr. performed the song on 15 May 2011 live at the ArenA, during the National Championship match between Ajax and FC Twente, the day Ajax clinched their 30th Eredivisie title.

Listings
The single was on the Single Top 100 for six weeks peaking at #17. It however never received any notation in the Netherlands Top 40.

Charts

Netherlands Single Top 100

Radio 2 Top 2000

René Froger version

In 2008 René Froger sang the song once more at the hitparade in cooperation with the Dutch football association (KNVB) ahead of the UEFA Euro 2008.

Chart performance

Netherlands Top 40

Netherlands Single Top 100

References
Footnotes

External links
 dutchcharts, Top40
 André Hazes's "Bloed, zweet en tranen" music video on YouTube
 René Froger's "Bloed, zweet en tranen" music video Froger

André Hazes songs
2002 singles
2008 singles
René Froger songs
Songs written by André Hazes
Dutch pop songs
Dutch-language songs
AFC Ajax songs
PSV Eindhoven songs
Football songs and chants
2002 songs